is a tokusatsu series created by Kōhan Kawauchi. This was the first superhero TV series produced by Toho Company Ltd., and was broadcast on NET (now TV Asahi) from October 6, 1972 to September 18, 1973, with a total of 52 episodes. Mitsuru Adachi wrote a manga series based on the show which was serialized in TV Magazine Otomodachi from 1972 to 1973.

Overview

The series focuses on pro wrestler Takeshi Yamato, a young man who, after training in India with the yogi sage Devadatta, gains the ability to transform into a superhero called Rainbowman who possesses seven different superhero forms called "Dashes", with the seven Dashes representing yin and yang (the Moon and the Sun) and the five elements (wu xing) of ancient Chinese philosophy. In each Dash form, Rainbowman is endowed with a color-coded costume and powers related to that element. Dash 1 (yellow) represents the Moon, Dash 2 (red) represents fire, Dash 3 (blue) represents water, Dash 4 (green) represents wood, Dash 5 (gold) represents metal, Dash 6 (brown) represents earth, and Dash 7 (white) represents the Sun. Later in the series, he gains the ability to create a fusion state between Dash 7 and any two other forms with all their related powers.

Rainbowman opposes the "Die Die Gang", a group representing hostile foreign powers bent on revenge against Japan for acts carried out in World War II. They make use of elite mercenaries, cyborgs, wizards and supernatural monsters in pursuit of their plans.

In 1982, a 22-episode anime remake loosely based on the series was produced. Instead of a superhero as in the live action series, the anime featured a young man who commands seven giant robots which can merge into a larger giant robot.

Cast
: 
Devadatta: 
: 
: 
: 
: 
: Reiko Mutō
: 
: Akihiko Hirata
: Machiko Soga

Theme songs

Opening song
Yuke Rainbowman (行けレインボーマン, Go Rainbowman)
Lyrics: Kawauchi Kohan
Composition: Jun Kitahara
Singer: Yū Mizushima (as Kenji Yasunaga)

Closing songs
Yamato Takeshi no uta (ヤマトタケシの歌, Theme of Yamato Takeshi (ep. 1 - ep. 13))
Lyrics: Kawauchi Kohan
Composition: Jun Kitahara
Singer: Yū Mizushima

Aitsu no namae wa Rainbowman (あいつの名前はレインボーマン, That Man's Name is Rainbowman (ep. 14 - ep. 52))
Lyrics: Kawauchi Kohan
Composition: Jun Kitahara
Singers: Cat's Eye and Young Fresh

Other song
Shineshine-dan no uta (死ね死ね団の歌, Theme of Shineshine-dan)
Lyrics: Kawauchi Kohan
Composition: Jun Kitahara
Singers: Cat's Eye and Young Fresh

External links
 Ai No Senshi Rainbow Man at Japan Hero (Archived)
 

1972 Japanese television series debuts
1972 manga
1982 anime television series debuts
1983 Japanese television series endings
Mitsuru Adachi
Super robot anime and manga
Toho tokusatsu
Tokusatsu television series
TV Asahi original programming
TBS Television (Japan) original programming
Mainichi Broadcasting System original programming
Transforming heroes